Van is a village in Kuh Dasht Rural District, Neyasar District, Kashan County, Isfahan Province, Iran. At the 2006 census, its population was 170, in 66 families.

References 

Populated places in Kashan County